Aydoun (alternatively Adun or Idoun or Edoun) is the name of a city in Irbid Governorate in Jordan. Some writers associate the town with the ancient city of Dium, one of the cities of the Decapolis, but this is disputed. It had a population of 63,244 as of 2018.

History
It had a population of 32  households and 21 bachelors; all Muslim. They paid a fixed tax-rate of 25%  on various  agricultural products, including wheat, barley, summer crops/vineyards/fruit trees, goats and beehives; a total of 10,215 akçe.

In 1838, Aydoun's inhabitants were predominantly Sunni Muslims, and the village was noted as located in the 'Beni Öbeid' area.

The Jordanian census of 1961 found 1,700 inhabitants in Aidun.

Notable people from Aydoun (Idoun)
 HE Major General Qassem Pasha Al-Nasser,
 Attorney General Mahmoud Hanandeh

References

Bibliography

Villages in Irbid governorate